Kate Delbarre (born 8 June 1925), known as Kate Bernheim during her first marriage, then as Kate d’Oriola, is a French foil fencer. She competed at the 1956 and 1960 Summer Olympics. She was married to France's most titled fencing champion Christian d'Oriola.

References

External links
 

1925 births
Living people
Sportspeople from Calais
French female foil fencers
Olympic fencers of France
Fencers at the 1956 Summer Olympics
Fencers at the 1960 Summer Olympics